In probability theory, the Komlós–Major–Tusnády approximation (also known as the KMT approximation, the KMT embedding, or the Hungarian embedding) refers to one of the two strong embedding theorems: 1) approximation of random walk by a standard Brownian motion constructed on the same probability space, and  2) an approximation of the empirical process by a Brownian bridge constructed on the same probability space. It is named after Hungarian mathematicians János Komlós, Gábor Tusnády, and Péter Major, who proved it in 1975.

Theory

Let  be independent uniform (0,1) random variables. Define a uniform empirical distribution function as

Define a uniform empirical process as

The Donsker theorem (1952) shows that  converges in law to a Brownian bridge  Komlós, Major and Tusnády established a sharp bound for the speed of this weak convergence.

Theorem (KMT, 1975) On a suitable probability space for independent uniform (0,1) r.v.  the empirical process  can be approximated by a sequence of Brownian bridges  such that

for all positive integers n and all , where a, b, and c are positive constants.

Corollary
A corollary of that theorem is that for any real iid r.v.  with cdf  it is possible to construct a probability space where independent sequences of empirical processes  and Gaussian processes  exist such that
      almost surely.

References
Komlos, J., Major, P. and Tusnady, G. (1975) An approximation of partial sums of independent rv’s and the sample df. I, Wahrsch verw Gebiete/Probability Theory and Related Fields, 32, 111–131. 
Komlos, J., Major, P. and Tusnady, G. (1976) An approximation of partial sums of independent rv’s and the sample df. II, Wahrsch verw Gebiete/Probability Theory and Related Fields, 34, 33–58. 

Empirical process